Benito Alfonso Bedoya y Díaz de Guzmán (April 16, 1904 – December 15, 1957) was a Mexican actor who frequently appeared in U.S. films. He is best known for his role in The Treasure of the Sierra Madre, where he played a bandit leader and delivered the "stinking badges" line, which has been called one of the greatest movie quotes in history by the American Film Institute.

Early life 
Bedoya was born in the small town of Vícam, Sonora, Mexico, of Yaqui Indian heritage, to Norberto Bedoya Perea and Ignacia Díaz de Guzmán. He had a nomadic childhood upbringing in Mexico, traveling throughout the country with his parents and 19 siblings.  At 14, he emigrated to the United States and was educated in Houston, Texas. He ran away from school and worked as a railroad section worker, dishwasher, waiter, and cotton picker.

Film career 
Bedoya found work as a character actor in the US and Mexican film industries in the 1930s to 1940s. During that time, he worked in over 175 Mexican films. His last movie, The Big Country, was released in 1958 after his death.

"Stinking badges" 
Bedoya is best remembered for his role in John Huston's 1948 adventure film The Treasure of the Sierra Madre as "Gold Hat", the bandit leader. Bedoya's role includes the famous outburst: "Badges? We ain't got no badges. We don't need no badges. I don't have to show you any stinkin' badges!" The line was ranked number 36 on AFI's 100 Greatest Movie Quotes list, and it has been widely referenced and parodied in TV, film, music, and literature. Treasure of Sierra Madre was also ranked number 30 on AFI's 100 Years…100 Movies.

Personal life

Bedoya married Gertrude Elizabeth Larky Karas on March 8, 1950, in Mexico City.

Bedoya completed filming The Big Country in November 1957, in California, and returned to Mexico City on December 8. Eight days later, after a night of partying with manicurist María Lucía Solana Martínez, Bedoya, 53, died of a heart attack in a Mexico City motel room.

Filmography

References

External links 
 

1904 births
1957 deaths
Mexican male film actors
Male actors from Sonora
20th-century Mexican male actors
Mexican people of Yaqui descent
Mexican emigrants to the United States
People from Guaymas Municipality
Mexican expatriate actors in the United States